Poetry is a form of literature.

Poetry, Poem(s), or Poetic(s) may also refer to:

Literature 

 Poems (Auden), three separate collections of the early poetry of W. H. Auden
 Poems (Agatha Christie), the second of two collections of poetry by Agatha Christie
 Poems (Emerson), a series of poems written in 1847 by Ralph Waldo Emerson
 Poems (William Golding), the first work by William Golding
 Poems (Hesse), a collection of 31 poems written by Hermann Hesse
 Poems (Wilfred Owen), a 1920 posthumous poetry collection
 Poems (Tennyson, 1842)
 Poems (William Carlos Williams), an early self-published volume of poems by William Carlos Williams
 Poems (Sextus Propertius), a collection of Latin poems written by Sextus Propertius in the 1st century BCE

Music 

 Poetics (album), a 2009 pop punk album
 Poem (album), a 2000 album by Canadian industrial/electronic music group Delerium
 "Poem" (song), a 2002 song by nu metal band Taproot
Poetry (album), an album by Stan Getz and Albert Dailey
"Poetry", a song by Danity Kane from their 2008 album platinum-selling album Welcome to the Dollhouse
 "Poetry", a song by Tamia from her 2004 album More

Other 

 Poetics (Aristotle)  (c. 335 BC), the earliest surviving work of dramatic theory
 Cognitive poetics, a school of literary criticism that applies the principles of cognitive science to the interpretation of literary texts
 Descriptive poetics, a form of literary criticism
 Historical poetics, a scholarly approach to film studies outlined in a book by David Bordwell
 Poetics, an academic journal published by Elsevier
 Per-oral endoscopic myotomy, a special surgery technique using endoscopy to operate inside the alimentary canal
 The Poem, a screenplay by Dawn Fields Wise about Lynchburg poet Bransford Vawter
 the IKEA Poäng chair, previously known as Poem
 Poetics, the theory of literary forms and literary discourse
 Poetics, a bimonthly peer-reviewed academic journal
 Poetry (film), a 2010 South Korean film directed by Lee Chang-dong
 Poetry (magazine), a journal published in Chicago
 Poetry, Georgia, an unincorporated community
 Poetry, Texas, an unincorporated community primarily in Kaufman County, Texas
 "Poetry", a poem by Marianne Moore
 a tool for packaging and dependency management in Python
POEMS syndrome, a medical condition

See also